In geometry, a hexagonal trapezohedron or deltohedron is the fourth in an infinite series of trapezohedra which are dual polyhedra to the antiprisms. It has twelve faces which are congruent kites. It can be described by the Conway notation .

It is an isohedral (face-transitive) figure, meaning that all its faces are the same. More specifically, all faces are not merely congruent but also transitive, i.e. lie within the same symmetry orbit. Convex isohedral polyhedra are the shapes that will make fair dice.

Symmetry
The symmetry a hexagonal trapezohedron is D6d of order 24. The rotation group is D6 of order 12.

Variations 
One degree of freedom within D6 symmetry changes the kites into congruent quadrilaterals with 3 edges lengths. In the limit, one edge of each quadrilateral goes to zero length, and these become bipyramids.

Crystal arrangements of atoms can repeat in space with a hexagonal trapezohedral configuration around one atom, which is always enantiomorphous, and comprises space groups 177–182. Beta-quartz is the only common mineral with this crystal system.

If the kites surrounding the two peaks are of different shapes, it can only have C6v symmetry, order 12. These can be called unequal trapezohedra. The dual is an unequal antiprism, with the top and bottom polygons of different radii. If it twisted and unequal its symmetry is reduced to cyclic symmetry, C6 symmetry, order 6.

Spherical tiling
The hexagonal trapezohedron also exists as a spherical tiling, with 2 vertices on the poles, and alternating vertices equally spaced above and below the equator.

Related polyhedra

References

External links 
 
Virtual Reality Polyhedra The Encyclopedia of Polyhedra
 VRML model <6>

Polyhedra